Desmond Albert Farrow (11 February 1926 – 5 January 2019) is an English former footballer who played in the Football League for Queens Park Rangers and Stoke City.

Career
Farrow was born in Peterborough and began his career with Leicester City before joining Queens Park Rangers during World War II. He played nine matches in the FA Cup in 1945–46 and began a regular in Dave Mangnall's QPR side in the Second Division in 1948–49. Rangers were relegated in 1951–52 and Farrow joined First Division Stoke City in October 1952. However, he struggled to establish himself at the Victoria Ground and left for Peterborough United after making just nine appearances.

Career statistics
Source:

References

External links
 

English footballers
Stoke City F.C. players
Queens Park Rangers F.C. players
Leicester City F.C. players
Peterborough United F.C. players
English Football League players
1926 births
2019 deaths
Association football defenders